Earth Heroes Awards are awards instituted by Royal Bank of Scotland in association with World Association of Zoos and Aquariums (WAZA) in 2011.

Award

Categories 
There are several award categories include:-
 RBS Earth Hero Award (Felicitation) Individual
 RBS Earth Guardian Award  (INR 1,50,000) – Institution 
 RBS Save The Species Award (INR 1,50,000)– 2 Individuals
 RBS Inspire Award – (INR 1,50,000) Individual or Institutional
 RBS Green Warrior Award – (INR 1,50,000 each) 2 individuals

Selection Process 
The finalist for each award would be selected by jury of experts from the field of conservation, bio-diversity, science, government, media, The Royal Bank of Scotland N.V, National Biodiversity Authority and the Bombay Natural History Society.

Earth Heroes Awards 2014 
The RBS Earth Heroes Awards 2014 was announced at awards function held on 4 November at Indira Gandhi National Centre for Arts (IGNCA) in New Delhi.

Winners
 RBS Earth Hero Award - Dr. Erach Bharucha
 RBS Earth Guardian Award - Kenneth Anderson Nature Society (KANS)
 RBS Save The Species Award - Pangti Village Council & Dr. Goutam Narayan
 RBS Inspire Award - Mr. Dhritiman Mukherjee
 RBS Green Warrior Award - Mr. Sujoy Banerjee & Shri. P. S. Somashekhar

Special Mention during 'Earth Heroes Awards' has been addressed to Padmaja Naidu Himalayan Zoological Park or Darjeeling Zoo, India's largest high altitude zoo, established on 14 August 1958.

References 

Zoo associations
Zoos in India